George Coates (25 July 1817 – 1885) was an English first-class cricketer and umpire.

Coates was born at Sheffield in July 1817. He made his debut in first-class cricket for Yorkshire against Manchester at Moss Lane in 1844, with Coates playing in the same fixture in 1845. He made two first-class appearances in 1846 for Sheffield (essentially Yorkshire in all but name) against Manchester at Sheffield and Manchester, before making four first-class appearances in 1848, with Coates playing two matches each against Manchester and Nottingham. He continued to play regularly for Yorkshire/Sheffield until 1854. He also played first-class cricket for a United England Eleven in 1853, making two appearances against Yorkshire and the Gentlemen of England, in addition to playing twice for the North in the North v South fixtures of 1854–55. Making 24 first-class appearances, Coates scored a total of 610 runs at an average of 16.48, with a high score of 61. He also stood as an umpire in two first-class matches in 1852 and 1855. Coates died at Sheffield in 1885.

References

External links

1817 births
1885 deaths
Cricketers from Sheffield
English cricketers
Yorkshire cricketers
Sheffield Cricket Club cricketers
English cricket umpires
United All-England Eleven cricketers
North v South cricketers